The Patrick J. Kelly Cup goes to the playoff champion of the ECHL. The Kelly Cup has been awarded to teams since 1997. Prior to 1997, the playoff winner was awarded the Riley Cup, named after former American Hockey League president Jack Riley. The current cup is named after Patrick J. Kelly, the league's first commissioner. The cup is loaned to the winning team for one year and is returned at the start of the following year's playoffs, although the trophy itself has been replaced three times with the first two iterations preserved in the Hockey Hall of Fame. The Kelly Cup Playoffs Most Valuable Player award is also given out as part of the Kelly Cup Championship ceremonies. Nick Vitucci and Dave Gagnon are the only players to win the award on multiple occasions.

Eighteen different teams have won the ECHL Championship, with nine (Alaska, Allen, Cincinnati, Colorado, Florida, Hampton Roads, Idaho, South Carolina, and Toledo) winning multiple times. The Hampton Roads Admirals, the Alaska Aces and the South Carolina Stingrays hold the record for most championships won with three. The Colorado Eagles, who won it in 2018 for their second consecutive title, moved to the American Hockey League in 2018–19. In 2019, the Eagles' ownership did not return the Kelly Cup to the ECHL before the playoffs, leading to the league creating a replacement trophy for the 2019 Kelly Cup playoffs. The Eagles' ownership eventually returned the cup before the 2019–20 season, and the league returned its status to be the primary trophy. The 2019 Kelly Cup was the fourth copy of the trophy, but was allowed to be kept by the Growlers when the previous cup returned to circulation.

Playoff format 
The Kelly Cup playoffs is an elimination tournament, consisting of four rounds of a best-of-seven series.  The format has changed often throughout the years.  Since 2016–17, the top four point earners from each division qualify. The first two playoff rounds are played within each division, followed by the conference finals (contested between the four division winners), and ending with the Kelly Cup finals (featuring the two conference champions).

List of ECHL champions

See also 
 ECHL awards

References

External links 
 

Awards established in 1997
1